Sze Yu (born 30 September 1962) is a Chinese-born Australian actor, television presenter and retired badminton player.

As a badminton player, he represented both Hong Kong and Australia. In the 1980s, he was one of the top players in the world.

He started his acting career in Taiwan, while still a badminton player. He has since acted in over 60 TV dramas in Taiwan and mainland China.

Athletic career

Sze Yu's father Sze Ning On was a Chinese Indonesian badminton player who in 1955 arrived in China to play for the China national badminton team (which at that time was completely made up of Chinese Indonesians). He married Sze Yu's mother, a teacher at the Central Academy of Drama, in Beijing, later moving the family to Shanghai where Sze Yu was born. Sze Yu started seriously playing his father's sport at age 9.

In 1979, the Sze family settled in British Hong Kong and Sze Yu soon distinguished himself as the top player in the territory. In September 1983, his family immigrated to Australia for his education. Despite having become an Australian citizen, Sze still represented Hong Kong in the 1984 Thomas Cup as he hadn't met the 2-year residency requirement to represent Australia.

Representing Australia, Sze received 2 medals at the 1986 Commonwealth Games. He was also named to the Australian 1986 Thomas Cup team but an injury kept him away from the competition. He did play at the 1988 Thomas Cup for Team Australia, coached by his father.

Individual Achievements

IBF World Grand Prix 
The World Badminton Grand Prix sanctioned by International Badminton Federation (IBF) from 1983 to 2006.

Men's singles

Team Competitions

Acting career
In 1989, while nursing an injury in Taipei, Taiwan, where his father took over the Chinese Taipei national badminton team a year prior, Sze Yu was invited by Liu Li-li, a television director, to participate in her TV drama Wanjun, written by the creator Chiung Yao. Liu was taking a team from Chinese Television System to Beijing to create the first-ever Taiwanese TV drama filmed in mainland China. Under the encouragement of his mother, a Beijing native, Sze took on the supporting role of Zhou Shuhao. The series proved massively popular throughout the Chinese-speaking world, and Sze, after winning the Australian International in the same year, decided to retire to pursue an acting career.

Today, Sze is still active in television, mostly in mainland China.

Filmography

Film

TV dramas

References

External links
 Sze Yu on Sina Weibo

Male actors from Shanghai
20th-century Hong Kong male actors
21st-century Hong Kong male actors
20th-century Australian male actors
21st-century Australian male actors
20th-century Chinese male actors
21st-century Chinese male actors
Chinese male television actors
Hong Kong male television actors
Australian male television actors
Chinese television presenters
Hong Kong television presenters
Australian television presenters
1962 births
Living people
Badminton players from Shanghai
Australian people of Chinese descent
Australian male badminton players
Hong Kong male badminton players
Badminton players at the 1982 Commonwealth Games
Commonwealth Games competitors for Hong Kong
Badminton players at the 1986 Commonwealth Games
Commonwealth Games silver medallists for Australia
Commonwealth Games bronze medallists for Australia
Commonwealth Games medallists in badminton
Badminton players at the 1982 Asian Games
Asian Games competitors for Hong Kong
Medallists at the 1986 Commonwealth Games